The history of the Jews in Lebanon encompasses the presence of Jews in present-day Lebanon stretching back to biblical times. Following large-scale emigration following the 1948 Arab–Israeli War, and much more importantly the Lebanese Civil War, the vast majority of Lebanese Jews now live in Western countries and many live in Israel. As the latest census in Lebanon was conducted in 1932, there are virtually no statistics available. In 2006, there were about 40 Jews in Lebanon, whereas in 2020 there were only about 29 Jews in Lebanon. Reports indicate that in 2022 the number of Jews in Lebanon was 27 to 20.

History

Early 20th century
In 1911, Jews from Italy,  Greece, Syria, Iraq, Turkey, Egypt and Iran moved to Beirut, expanding the community there with more than 5,000 additional members. Articles 9 and 10 of the 1926 Constitution of Lebanon guaranteed the freedom of religion and provided each religious community, including the Jewish community, the right to manage its own civil matters, including education, and thus the Jewish community was constitutionally protected, a fact that did not apply to other Jewish communities in the region.  The Jewish community prospered under the French mandate and Greater Lebanon, exerting considerable influence throughout Lebanon and beyond. They allied themselves with Pierre Gemayel's Phalangist Party (a  right wing, Maronite group modelled after similar movements in Italy and Germany, and Franco's Phalangist movement in Spain.) and played an instrumental role in the establishment of Lebanon as an independent state.

During the Greater Lebanon period, two Jewish newspapers were founded, the Arabic language Al-Alam al-Israili (the Israelite World) and the French language Le Commerce du Levant, an economic periodical which continued to be in circulation until June 2021.

The Jewish community of Beirut evolved in three distinct phases. Until 1908, the Jewish population in Beirut grew by migration from the Syrian interior and from other Ottoman cities like İzmir, Salonica, Istanbul, and Baghdad. Commercial growth in the thriving port-city, consular protection, and relative safety and stability in Beirut all accounted for the Jewish migration. Thus, from a few hundred at the beginning of the 19th century, the Jewish community grew to 2,500 by the end of the century, and to 3,500 by World War I. While the number of Jews grew considerably, the community remained largely unorganized. During this period, the community lacked some of the fundamental institutions such as communal statutes, elected council, welfare and taxation mechanisms. In this period, the most organized and well-known Jewish institution in the city was probably the private Tiferet Israel (The Glory of Israel) boarding-school founded by Zaki Cohen in 1874. The school attracted Jewish students from prosperous families like Shloush (Jaffa), Moyal (Jaffa), and Sassoon (Baghdad). Its founder, influenced by the Ottoman reforms and by local cultural trends, aspired to create a modern yet Jewish school. It offered both secular and strictly Jewish subjects as well as seven languages. It also offered commercial subjects. The school was closed at the beginning of the 20th century due to financial hardships.

The Young Turk Revolution (1908) sparked the organization process. Within six years, the Beirut community created a general assembly, an elected twelve-member council, drafted communal statutes, appointed a chief rabbi, and appointed committees to administer taxation and education. The process involved tension and even conflicts within the community, but eventually, the community council established its rule and authority in the community. The chief rabbi received his salary from the community and was de facto under the council's authority.

With the establishment of Greater Lebanon (1920), the Jewish community of Beirut became part of a new political entity. The French mandate rulers adopted local political traditions of power-sharing and recognized the autonomy of the various religious communities. Thus, the Jewish community was one of Lebanon's sixteen communities and enjoyed a large measure of autonomy, more or less along the lines of the Ottoman millet system. During the third phase of its development, the community founded two major institutions: the Maghen Abraham Synagogue (1926), and the renewed Talmud-Torah Selim Tarrab community school (1927). The community also maintained welfare services like the Biqur-Holim, Ozer-Dalim, and Mattan-Basseter societies. The funding for all these institutions came from contributions of able community members, who contributed on Jewish holidays and celebrations, through subscription of prominent members, fund-raising events and lotteries the community organized. In fact, the community was financially independent and did not rely on European Jewish philanthropy.

The development of the Jewish yishuv in Palestine influenced the Jewish leadership, who usually showed sympathy and active support for Zionism. The Jewish leadership in Beirut during this time aligned itself ideologically with the American-Based B'nai B'rith organization through its local proxy (Arzei Ha-Levanon Lodge) which was staffed by local community leaders. The B'nai B'rith lodge in Beirut attracted the social and economic elite. It embarked on community progress and revival through social activism, Jewish solidarity, and philanthropic values. Unlike the Alliance, who mainly aspired to empower the Jewish individual through modern education, the B'nai B'rith strove to empower both the individual and the community as a whole. In Beirut, unlike other Jewish communities, most of the community council members were also B'nai B'rith members, hence there existed an overlap between the council and the lodge. Of course, the Alliance school was popular in the community as it focused on French and prepared students for higher education. Since there was no Jewish high school in Beirut, many Jewish students attended foreign (Christian) schools, either secular or religious. The Jewish community was one of the smaller communities in the country, and hence it was not entitled for a guaranteed representation in the Parliament. Being excluded from Lebanese political life, the Jewish leadership aspired to improve the community's public standing by consolidating and improving the community as a whole. Overall, the French mandate period was characterized by growth, development, and stability.

In the 20th century, the Jewish community in Lebanon showed little involvement or interest in politics. They were generally traditional as opposed to religious and were not involved in the feuds of the larger religious groups in the country. Broadly speaking, they tended to support Lebanese nationalism and felt an affinity toward France. French authorities at the time discouraged expressions of Zionism (which they saw as a tool of their British rival), and the community was mostly apathetic to it. A few community leaders, such as Joseph Farhi, fervently supported the Zionist cause, and there was a level of support for the concept of a Jewish state in Palestine. The Jews in Lebanon had good contacts with those in Palestine, and there were regular visits between Beirut and Jerusalem. Accounts by the Alliance Israélite Universelle, which established schools that most Jewish children in the country attended, spoke of active Zionism while the Jewish Agency lamented the lack of national sentiment. The World Zionist Organization was also disappointed with the lack of more active support, and the community did not send a delegation to the World Zionist Congress.
 
A young Lebanese Jew named Joseph Azar, who took it upon himself to advance the Zionist cause with other individuals in October 1930, said in a report for the Jewish Agency that: "Before the disturbance of August 1929 the Jews...of Lebanon manifested much sympathy for the Zionist cause and worked actively for the sake of Palestine. They had established associations which collected money for (sic) Keren Kayemeth and (sic) Keren Heyesod." He said that after 1929, the Jews "started to fear from (sic) anything having any connection with Zionism and ceased to hold meetings and collect money." He also said that the Jewish Communal Council in Beirut "endeavored to prevent anything having a Jewish national aspect because they feared that this might wound the feelings of the Muslims." Other sources suggested that such charity work was not so much motivated by Zionism as it was by an interest to help Jews in need.
 
The Maccabi organization was recognized officially by Lebanese authorities and was an active center for Jewish cultural affairs in Beirut and Saida. The Maccabi taught Hebrew language and Jewish history, and was the focus point of the small Zionist movement in the country. There was also a pro-Zionist element within the Maronite community in Lebanon.
 
After the 1929 riots in Jerusalem, the Grand Mufti of Jerusalem was expelled from Palestine and he chose to settle in Lebanon, where continued to mobilize resistance against Zionist claims to Palestine. During the riots, some Muslim nationalists and editors of a major Greek-Orthodox newspaper (both of whom saw the fate of the emerging Lebanese state as one within a broader Arab context) sought to incite the disturbances in Lebanon, where until that point most ethno-religious groups were aloof to the forecoming conflict in Palestine. It also seemed to have an effect on the cryptic response given by Interior Minister Habib Abou Chahla to Joseph Farhi when, on behalf of the Jewish community, he requested that they receive a seat in the newly expanded Lebanese Parliament.

Outside of Beirut, the attitudes toward Jews were usually more hostile. In November 1945, fourteen Jews were killed in anti-Jewish riots in Tripoli. Further anti-Jewish events occurred in 1948 following the 1948 Arab–Israeli War. The ongoing insecurity combined with the greater opportunities that Beirut offered prompted most of the remaining Jews of Tripoli to relocate to Beirut.

1947 onward

The Jewish community was traditionally located in Wadi Abu Jamil and Ras Beirut, with other communities in Chouf, Deir al-Qamar, Aley, Bhamdoun, and Hasbaya.

Lebanon was the only Arab country whose Jewish population increased after the declaration of the State of Israel in 1948, reaching around 10,000 people. However, after the Lebanon Crisis of 1958, many Lebanese Jews left the country, especially for Israel, France, United States, Canada and Latin America (mostly to Brazil).

The main synagogue in Beirut was bombed in the early 1950s, and the Lebanese Chamber of Deputies witnessed heated debates on the status of Lebanese Jewish army officers. The discussions culminated in a unanimous resolution to expel and exclude them from the Lebanese Army. The two Jewish army officers were discharged, but a few Jews continued to work for the government. The Jewish population of Beirut, which stood at 9,000 in 1948, dwindled to 2,500 by 1969.

The Lebanese Civil War, which started in 1975, was much worse for the Lebanese Jewish community, and some 200 were killed in pogroms. Most of the 1,800 remaining Lebanese Jews migrated in 1976, fearing that the growing Syrian presence in Lebanon would restrict their freedom to emigrate. In 1982, during the 1982 Israeli invasion of Lebanon, 11 leaders of the Jewish community were captured and killed by Islamic extremists. The community buildings also suffered during those days. During the Israeli Army's advance toward Beirut, Yasser Arafat assigned Palestinian gunmen to stand guard at the Maghen Abraham Synagogue, an important symbol of the community, located near Parliament. The synagogue was bombarded by the Israeli Air Force, perhaps on the presumption that it was being used as a weapons depot by Palestinians. During the Israeli invasion, some of the Lebanese Jews who had emigrated to Israel returned as invading troops.

Jews were targeted in the later years of the Lebanese civil war. Isaac Sasson, a leader of the Lebanese Jewish community, who was kidnapped at gunpoint March 31, 1985, on his way from the Beirut International Airport, after a trip to Abu Dhabi. Earlier, kidnappers had also seized Eli Hallak, 60-year-old physician; Haim Cohen, a 39-year-old Jew; Isaac Tarrab; Yeheda Benesti; Salim Jammous; and Elie Srour. Cohen, Tarrab, and Srour were killed by their captors, a Shiite Muslim group called The Organization of the Oppressed on Earth, which is believed to have been part of or had links to Hezbollah. The others' fates remain unknown, but they are believed to have also been killed.

But the damage that continued to the bombing was the product of anti-Jewish extremists. Wadi Abu Jamil, the Jewish quarter of Beirut, is now virtually abandoned and the synagogue dilapidated. The recently assassinated Prime Minister Rafik Hariri promised to rebuild the synagogue, but he died without being able to fulfill his promise. There are currently around 40 Jews left in Beirut, mostly elderly.

Without a rabbi, Lebanese Jews find it difficult to continue their religious traditions and tend to keep a low profile to protect themselves from attacks related to the misconception that every Jew is an agent of Israel. One of the few remaining synagogues in Lebanon is at Deir el Qamar. This synagogue, although in good condition, is not used for security reasons. Danny Chamoun, mayor of Deir el Qamar and son of former Lebanese President Camille Chamoun, has occasionally offered support to members of the Lebanese Jewish community.

An estimated 6,000 Lebanese Jews emigrated in the wake of the 1967 Arab–Israeli War, shrinking the community down to 450 by 1975. The Lebanese Civil War and 1982 war with Israel further reduced the number of Jews in the country. Much of the emigration was to countries with existing well-established Lebanese or Lebanese Jewish diaspora communities, such as Brazil, France, Switzerland, Canada and the United States.

21st century 
In 2010, work began to restore an old synagogue in Beirut, the Maghen Abraham Synagogue. The synagogue had fallen into disrepair after being bombed by Israel several years earlier. The roof had collapsed and trees and bushes had grown under it. Solidere agreed to provide funds for the renovation because political officials believed it would portray Lebanon as an open society tolerant of Judaism. The restoration was successful as Haaretz titled the "synagogue restored to glory". None of the Jews involved in the project agreed to be identified.

The international media and even some members of the Jewish community (in and out of Lebanon) questioned who would pray there. The self-declared head of the Jewish Community Council, Isaac Arazi, who left Lebanon in 1983, eventually came forward but refused to show his face on camera in a television interview, fearing that his business would suffer if clients knew they had been dealing with a Jew.

The Lebanese Jews live mostly in or around Beirut. The community has been described as elderly and apprehensive. There are no services at Beirut's synagogues. In 2015, the estimated total Jewish population in Syria and Lebanon combined was 100. In 2020 the total number of Jews in Lebanon is 29.

Lebanese Jewish-born Notables 

 Jack Benaroya- Philanthropist and civic leader
 John Grabow- Major League Baseball player 
 Adriana Behar- Olympic medalist in beach volleyball
 Joseph Safra- Brazilian Banker
 Guy Beart- French singer and songwriter
 Emmanuelle Beart- French actress
 Sasson Dayan- Brazilian Banker
Murielle Telio- American actress
Edmundo Safdie- Brazilian banker
Moshe Safdie- canadian architect
Safdie brothers- film directors
Don Charney- founder of American Apparel
 Michael Netzer- comic book writer
 Ezra Nahmad- art collector
 Ariel Helwani- MMA journalist
Neil Sedaka- singer
Edgar de Picciotto- banker in Geneva
 Gad Saad- evolutionary psychologist
Justin Hurwitz- Oscar winning musical composer
 Niels Schneider- actor
Michael Benaroya- movie producer
Caroline Aaron- American actress
Yfrah Neaman- british violinist
 Yuval Noah Harari- historian and philosopher
 Karine Nahon- scientist
 Lolita Chammah- French actress
Bob Dishy- American actor
 Esther Moyal- writer
 Gad Lerner- journalist and TV presenter
 Jose Maria Benegas- politician
 Joanna Hausmann- comedian
Adela Cojab- activist and author
Ana María Shua-  Argentinian writer
 Eddy Cohen - Israeli professor and researcher

Jewish Community Presidents 
The Jewish Community Presidents include:
Ezra Anzarut  Prior to 1910
Joseph. D. Farhi 1910–1924
Joseph Dichy Bey 1925–1927
Joseph D. Farhi 1928–1930
Selim Harari 1931–1934
Joseph D. Farhi 1935–1938
Deab Saadia & Joseph Dichy Bey-  1939–1950
Joseph Attiyeh 1950–1976
Isaac Sasson 1977–1985
Raoul Mizrahi 1985
Joseph Mizrahi 1986-2003
Isaac Arazi 2005 – present

Jewish Community Vice Presidents
 Joseph Balayla 1926–1931. (was also the treasurer of the community)
 Yaakov (Jackes) Balayla 1931–1934. (Jackes and Joseph Balayla were brothers)
 Ezra Cohen 1962-1975
 Semo Bechar 2005–present

Chief rabbis
Between the years of 1799 and 1978, a series of Chief Rabbis led the Lebanese Jewish community.

Rabbi Moïse Yedid-Levy 1799–1829
Rabbi Ralph Alfandari
Rabbi Youssef Mann
Rabbi Aharoun Yedid-Levy
Rabbi Zaki Cohen 1875
Rabbi Menaché Ezra Sutton
Rabbi Jacob Bukai
Rabbi Haïm Dana
Rabbi Moïse Yedid-Levy
Rabbi Nassim Afandi Danon 1908–1909
Rabbi Jacob Tarrab 1910–1921
Rabbi Salomon Tagger 1921–1923
Rabbi Shabtai Bahbouth 1924–1950
Rabbi Benzion Lichtman 1932–1959
Rabbi Jacob Attiyeh 1949–1966
Rabbi Shaul Chreim 1960–1978

See also

Wadi Abu Jamil (Jewish Quarter of Beirut)
Deir el Qamar Synagogue (Chouf, Lebanon)
Maghen Abraham Synagogue (Beirut, Lebanon)
Bhamdoun Synagogue (Aley, Lebanon)
Sidon Synagogue (Sidon, Lebanon)
Beth Elamen Cemetery
Zaki Cohen, Beirut Chief Rabbi
Jewish Migration from Lebanon Post-1948
Jewish exodus from Arab lands
Congregation Maghen Abraham (Montreal) (Montreal, Canada)
Israel–Lebanon relations
Religion in Lebanon

Notes

References

External links
The official site of the Lebanese Jewish Community Council
Jewish Lebanese community in Canada
Lebanon Jews Tap Diaspora to Rebuild Beirut's Shelled Synagogue By Massoud A. Derhally of Bloomberg News-Sept. 18, 2008
Restoration of Beirut’s Synagogue Begins With Help of Diaspora By Massoud A. Derhally of Bloomberg News-Aug. 5, 2009
Lament Lebanon's lost tribe, The Daily Star (Lebanon).
Time Blog:The Jews of Lebanon
Review of the book, "The Jews of Lebanon" by Kirsten E. Schulze
A Bibliography on Lebanese Jewry (In Hebrew and English)
Lebanon – Jews Library of Congress Country Studies
Beirut's Jewish community faces slow decline AFP Jul 20, 2008

 
Ethnic groups in Lebanon
Middle Eastern diaspora in Lebanon
Lebanon
History of Lebanon
History of Lebanon by topic